Oleksandr Yatsenko (born 22 November 1958) is a Ukrainian archer. He competed in the men's individual and team events at the 1996 Summer Olympics.

References

1958 births
Living people
Ukrainian male archers
Olympic archers of Ukraine
Archers at the 1996 Summer Olympics
Place of birth missing (living people)